Andrew Pickett (born May 12, 1996) is a professional Canadian football offensive lineman for the Hamilton Tiger-Cats of the Canadian Football League (CFL).

University career
Pickett played U Sports football for the Guelph Gryphons from 2014 to 2017. He was named an OUA All-Star three times and was named a U Sports All-Canadian in 2017.

Professional career

Ottawa Redblacks
Pickett was drafted by the Ottawa Redblacks in the third round, 22nd overall, in the 2018 CFL Draft and signed with the team on May 16, 2018. However, he suffered a season-ending injury before the regular season began and spent the entire 2018 season on the injured list. In 2019, he sustained another injury and was again out for the season. He did not play in 2020 due to the cancellation of the 2020 CFL season.

Entering the 2021 season fully healthy, Pickett played in his first professional game in the Redblacks' season opening win against the Edmonton Elks on August 7, 2021. He later made his first professional start on September 22, 2021, against the Hamilton Tiger-Cats. He spent part of 2022 training camp with the team, but was released after the first pre-season game on May 29, 2022. He played in 13 regular season games on 2021. However, he was released after the first 2022 pre-season game on May 29, 2022.

Hamilton Tiger-Cats
On June 14, 2022, it was announced that Pickett had signed a practice roster agreement with the Hamilton Tiger-Cats.

Personal life
Pickett was born in Kitchener, Ontario to parents John and Terri Pickett.

References

External links
Hamilton Tiger-Cats bio

Living people
1996 births
Canadian football offensive linemen
Guelph Gryphons football players
Hamilton Tiger-Cats players
Ottawa Redblacks players
Players of Canadian football from Ontario
Sportspeople from Kitchener, Ontario